Poromechanics is a branch of physics and specifically continuum mechanics and acoustics that studies the behaviour of fluid-saturated porous media. A porous medium or a porous material is a solid referred to as matrix) permeated by an interconnected network of pores (voids) filled with a fluid (liquid or gas). Usually both solid matrix and the pore network, or pore space, are assumed to be continuous, so as to form two interpenetrating continua such as in a sponge. Natural substances including rocks, soils, biological tissues including heart and cancellous bone, and man-made materials such as foams and ceramics can be considered as porous media. Porous media whose solid matrix is elastic and  the fluid is viscous are called poroelastic. A poroelastic medium is characterised by its porosity, permeability as well as the properties of its constituents (solid matrix and fluid).

The concept of a porous medium originally emerged in soil mechanics, and in particular in the works of Karl von Terzaghi, the father of soil mechanics. However a more general concept of a poroelastic medium, independent of its nature or application, is usually attributed to Maurice Anthony Biot (1905–1985), a Belgian-American engineer. In a series of papers published between 1935 and 1962 Biot developed the theory of dynamic poroelasticity (now known as Biot theory) which gives a complete and general description of the mechanical behaviour of a poroelastic medium. Biot's equations of the linear theory of poroelasticity are derived from
the equations of linear elasticity for a solid matrix, 
the Navier–Stokes equations for a viscous fluid, and  Darcy's law for a flow of fluid through a porous matrix.

One of the key findings of the theory of poroelasticity is that in poroelastic media there exist three types of elastic waves: a shear or transverse wave, and two types of longitudinal or compressional waves, which Biot called type I and type II waves. The transverse and type I (or fast) longitudinal wave are similar to the transverse and longitudinal waves in an elastic solid, respectively. The slow compressional wave, (also known as Biot’s slow wave) is unique to poroelastic materials. The prediction of the Biot’s slow wave generated some controversy, until it was experimentally observed by Thomas Plona in 1980. Other important early contributors to the theory of poroelasticity were Yakov Frenkel and Fritz Gassmann.

Conversion of energy from fast compressional and shear waves into the highly attenuating slow compressional wave is a significant cause of elastic wave attenuation in porous media.

Recent applications of poroelasticity to biology such as modeling of blood
flows through the beating myocardium have also required an extension of the equations to nonlinear (large deformation) elasticity and the inclusion of inertia forces.

See also
Petrophysics
Rock physics

References

Further reading

External links
 Poronet - PoroMechanics Internet Resources Network
 APMR - Acoustical Porous Material Recipes

Continuum mechanics
Acoustics
Applied and interdisciplinary physics
Porous media